William Basset may refer to:
William Basset (12th-century judge) (c. 1134–c. 1185), Anglo-Norman administrator and justice
William Basset (divine) (1644–1695), English divine
William Basset (13th-century judge) (died 1249), English judge

See also
William Bassett (disambiguation)